Mahuva is a town and taluka of Bhavnagar District, in the state of Gujarat, India. Located on the coast of the Arabian Sea, Mahuva is known for its mild weather and green, lush surroundings, including many coconut tree plantations. The town is a part of the Saurashtra region and is known as the Kashmir of Saurashtra. Mahuva is also known for wooden toys, raw onions, groundnuts, and a local variety of mango called the Jamadar. The region is home to a thriving agribusiness industry, particularly enterprises that dehydrate vegetables such as garlic and onions for use in processed foods.

Geography
Mahuva is a Taluka (subdistrict) located in Bhavnagar District, in the state of Gujarat, as well as the name of a town within the taluka. Mahuva is in the coastal region of Saurashtra on the Gulf of Khambhat, which is a bay on the coast of the Arabian Sea.

Climate

Demographics
There were a total of 27,607 households. Most residents of Mahuva are Hindus and Muslims; a smaller number are Jains and Christians.

Economy

The local economy of Mahuva is primarily based on the agricultural produce market and industries. The Mahuva Agricultural Produce Market Committee (APMC) was established in 1858.

Mahuva and its surrounding villages are known for their onion production. The Mahuva market yard is the second largest onion trading centre in India after Lasalgaon, Maharashtra. It is spread across 38–40 acres of land. The region is the largest producer of white onions and the second-largest producer of red onions in the country. Therefore, onion is the largest trading commodity in Mahuva APMC. Mahuva is a large hub for onion processing and exporting, with over 120 large-scale dehydration plants. Onions from Mahuva Market are transported to many regions of India.

Peanuts, cotton and coconuts are also major trading commodities of this market. It is the only APMC of the state where coconuts are officially traded. Cotton ginning is also conducted in the region. There are many small and large poultry farms in Mahuva, including an emu farm. The Jamadar mango and Ramfal are special varieties of fruit found in Mahuva. Mahuva is the only place in Gujarat where specialized irrigation systems are needed to control soil salinity.

Pipavav Port is a fast-growing seaport located nearby, and India's first private sector port situated in Rajula. Reliance Naval and Engineering Limited, one of India's largest shipbuilding and heavy industry companies, operates out of the port.

There are many diamond cutting and polishing centres with ties to overseas markets. Some are working for diamantaires in Surat.

Mahuva is also known for wooden toys and other wooden handicrafts.

A recent surge in the growth of food processing industries, rope manufacturing units, cold storage chains and diamond polishing centres in Mahuva region has increased employment in the region.

Healthcare
Mahuva has two hospitals. Sadbhavana Hospital was recently approved to be upgraded from Municipal Hospital status to Civil Hospital, and is undergoing improvements to reflect the change in status. It is located on the outskirts of Mahuva near Vadali. Kanubhai Kalsariya was a pioneering doctor from the hospital. Hanumant Trust Hospital is a second hospital situated on the bypass road, which was developed as a multi-specialty hospital.

There are also private clinics, many within nursing homes, offering a variety of services, including physicians, paediatricians, ophthalmologists, orthopaedic surgeons, general surgeons, gynecologists, anesthesiologists, pathologists, dentists, and physiotherapists. Mahuva taluka's main crop is onion, cotton and groundnuts, Mahuva is the biggest producer of dehydrated onion and garlic in India and its contribution is 90% of all India dehydrated vegetables export.also mahuva have many cotton ginning factories and one of the oldest ginning factories is Asha cotton industry started in 1998 by Dr B T Valia.

Transport
Mahuva is connected to all major cities of Gujarat and other Indian states by road and rail.

Local

Auto rickshaws and taxis are available in town. GSRTC buses service connects Mahuva to other cities and nearby villages.

Road

Mahuva is approximately 97 km away from Bhavnagar and approximately 290 km from Ahmedabad. It is connected to Diu, Somnath, Palitana and Amreli via state highways. Private buses are well connected with Ahmedabad, Vadodara and Surat. GSRTC buses operate regularly, connecting Mahuva to these places. Private travel organizations also operate buses to Mumbai. These buses can reach Ahmedabad from Mahuva in about six hours, and Vadodara in about eight hours.

Rail

There are direct weekly or daily trains. The major route is the Mahuva–Mumbai Bandra (T.) SF Express, connecting major cities (Ahmedabad, Vadodara, Surat). Weekly train Mahuva–Mumbai Bandra (T.) available on Thursday and Saturday from Mahuva Junction. While direct train Mahuva-Surat Superfast Train is available on daily basis.

Air
 
The nearest airport is Bhavnagar Airport at Bhavnagar, about 100 km away from Mahuva. Private buses and GSRTC buses are available to Mahuva from the airport.

Water

The RORO ferry, the first of its kind in India, began operating in 2017, and connects the ports of Ghogha and Dahej in Gujarat.

Education

Colleges
 Shree K.V. Parekh Science, Matushree T.K. Arts & Smt. G.S. Parekh Commerce College, Mahuva PTC College; run by Shri Radheshyam Charitable TrustHigh Schools Hanumant High School (RBK) 
 J.P. Parekh High School
 Jafari and Fatema English School; run by Al-Imaan Trust, Mumbai
 Sheth M.N. High School
 St. Thomas School Mahuva; run by the Carmelites of Mary Immaculate; part of AINACS (All India National Association of Catholic Schools)
 Holy family English medium high schoolPrimary Schools Shri Swaminarayana Gurukul
 Shri Swaminarayan Gurukul NeshvadMedium Schools' Gujarati Medium School; run by Shri Radheshyam Charitable Trust
 Holy Family English Medium School
 Shri Radheshyam English Medium School; run by Shri Radheshyam Charitable Trust
 Vidhya Vihar Education Trust; Gujarati medium school

Attractions
There are two public parks in Mahuva, Gandhi Baug and Kuber Baug.
There is new attraction opened recently at the outskirts of the Mahuva named The City Mall and Multiplex which houses newly opened Cine Arc Multiplex having Dolby Digital Sound System with premium seatings, Game Zone, and Real Paprika Pizzeria etc. It became new popular weekend destination for the people of Mahuva located on the Mahuva-Bhavnagar National Highway near Bhadrod village and distanced approximately 5 kilometers from the city. In short span of time it became popular destinations among youth, movie lovers and children.

Mahuva is home to many religious temples and monuments that are popular with local Hindu and Jain adherents. Gaytri Mata Shaktipith, a temple made in the shape of a lotus, is the Prana Pratishtha of Gayatridevi. It opened in 1981, on the celebration of Jalaram Jayanti. The Dwarkadhish temple (also known as Haveli) is attended daily by devotees to Shrinathji. The location where Bhagatji Maharaj was born and resided throughout his life has been preserved. A BAPS Swaminarayan temple located on the western outskirts of the town was inaugurated in 2014 by Mahant Swami Maharaj. The temple is made of pink stones and inspired by Pramukh Swami Maharaj. The Mahuva Jain Tirth, known as Madhumati in ancient scriptures, is the birthplace of Sheth Javad Shah and Sheth Jadadu Shah. This shrine to Sri Mahavir is venerated as "Jivit Swami" and is included in the Panch Tirthi of Sri Shatrunjay shrines.

Tatkaleshvar Mahadev temple, located south-west of Mahuva city, is visited by a large number of devotees, particularly during the Hindu month of Shraavana. It is a popular stop for pilgrims visiting the Somnath temple and sometimes referred to as "Little Somnath". Many travel to the ancient Bhutnath Mahadev temple of Shiva at Vadli, located north-east of Mahuva, during the month of Shraavana.

Bhavani beach, is a popular picnic spot located south-east of Mahuva. Bhavani Mata Mandir is an ancient temple located on the beach.

Wildlife

A large population of white-rumped vultures can be found in Mahuva. There are 234 other bird species found in the area, and it is the only area of Bhavnagar district where jungle babblers are found.

Neighbouring villages

Pingleshwar, a small village near Mahuva, is known for a very old Shivling under the sea. It is only visible in the morning when the tide is out.

Talgajarda, the birthplace of Morari Bapu, is 5 kilometers from Mahuva. It is known for its temples, including a Ganesha temple.

Mota Khuntavada (19 kilometres from Mahuva, 60 kilometres from Palitana) is known for its Jain temple and its 90-year-old Ganesha temple, Sidhhganesh Ashram Mota Khuntavada. Mota Khuntavada lies between Mava Dungar Hill, which is surrounded by Malan Dam Lake, and Chitradhar Hill. There is also a 100-year-old Hanuman temple in the lake, and nearby a 150-year-old Mahakali Devi temple.

Kotamoi is a small village of Mahuva. Kotamoi is at the near Rojki river.

Uncha Kotda, or Unchakotada, (27 kilometers east of Mahuva) is a temple to Chamunda Devi that is revered as a mini Shaktipith.

Otha, 14 kilometers from Mahuva, is home to Shashtri Jivalal Mulshankar Pandya, a Bhagvat Kathakar.

Bagdana, the village of the mystic Bajrangdas Bapa, is 35 kilometres from Mahuva. The temple is visited throughout the year, especially Guru Purnima and tithi. Half a million people pay homage to the temple each year.

Notable figures

 Morari Bapu: known for his Ram Katha (religious storytelling based on the Ramayana''); lives in nearby village of Talgajarda
 Virchand Gandhi, Bharat Kesari and Swami Vivekanand sailed to participate at the first World Parliament of Religions in Chicago in 1893 and drew worldwide attention
 Bhagatji Maharaj: born in 1829 in Mahuva; second spiritual successor of Lord Swaminarayan in the BAPS Swaminarayan Sanstha, a Hindu denomination; his Smruti Mandir is under construction at the place where he was given final rituals after death in 1897
 Chhabildas Mehta: born in Mahuva; Indian politician and the former Chief Minister of Gujarat; played a pivotal role in the Maha Gujarat campaign for getting Gujarat the status of a separate state
 Harkisan Mehta: Gujarati author
 Asha Parekh: Bollywood actress of the 70s; lead actress in many Hindi movies
 Himesh Reshammiya: Bollywood actor, singer, music director, producer. He was born in Mahuva.

References

Port cities and towns of the Arabian Sea
Port cities in India
Cities and towns in Bhavnagar district